Heiloo is a municipality and town in the Netherlands, located in the province of North Holland. The community is part of the cooperation region Kennemerland and is located in the historical region of West Friesland.

Origins of the name
Heiloo (from the Dutch heilige loo, "sacred forest") was given its name because Saint Willibrord was said to have performed a miracle there around 690 and created a church on a small hill.

Notable attractions
It has a town hall dating from 1926 and a church from the 12th century known as the Witte Kerk. In the late Middle Ages, after a miracle, a Marian shrine came into being for Our Lady to Need (Onze Lieve Vrouwe ter Nood). The chapel was partially destroyed in 1573 during the Spanish Siege of Alkmaar, and it was completely demolished in 1637. Before it was razed to the ground, the Alkmaar painter Gerrit Pietersz. de Jongh depicted a family on a pilgrimage at the ruins of the single wall left remaining after the siege. Pilgrimage started to flourish again in 1713 when a spring started to sprout where the chapel had stood. The Marian sanctuary, situated outside the village in a so-called procession park, is one of the major pilgrimage destinations in the Netherlands, attracting pilgrims mainly from the diocese of Haarlem-Amsterdam.
In the 1950s and 1960s the population grew quickly as many residents of Amsterdam moved to the area. Many residents work and attend school in the neighbouring city of Alkmaar.

Sporting clubs 
 FCC Boscrossers  – The local BMX club that has produced 5 World Champions, 4 European Champions and many National Champions, the current (2013) 17-24-year-old Double World Champion for 20" and Cruiser Class is Robin Van Der Kolk, who won both titles in Auckland New Zealand.
 AV Trias – The local athletics club that has produced 2 Olympic athletes, Lisanne de Witte and Laura de Witte.

Local government
The municipal council of Heiloo consists of 19 seats, which are divided as follows:

 Heiloo 2000 – 3 seats
 VVD – 4 seats
 CDA – 2 seats
 PvdA – 2 seats
 Heiloo Local – 2 seats
 GBH – 3 seats
D66 - 3 seats

Current mayor: Mascha ten Bruggencate (D66).

Railway connections 

Heiloo is connected to the Dutch railway network by Heiloo railway station. From this station there are many destinations available such as: Alkmaar, Hoorn, Uitgeest, Zaandam, Amsterdam, Utrecht, 's-Hertogenbosch, Eindhoven, The Hague, Weert, Roermond, Maastricht and Heerlen.
For the Zaanse Schans, you should travel to Uitgeest and change onto a train to Koog-Zaandijk

There used to be a second stop on the railway line between Heiloo and Limmen. Until October 2013 it was used once a month to bring pilgrims to the nearby chapel. The name of both station and chapel is 'Onze lieve vrouwe ter nood' or 'Our Lady to Need'; the station was known as Runxputte until 1914. One of the platforms was demolished in 1997 for safety reasons.

Notable residents 

 Jos van Kemenade (1937-2020) politician and sociologist
 Jos Brink (1942–2007), television and theater personality 
 Guus Janssen (born 1951), composer and pianist
 Jacques Zoon (born 1961), flautist
 Maarten van Roozendaal (1962–2013) a Dutch singer, comedian and songwriter 
 Lars Oostveen (born 1976) stage name Lawrence Ray, is a Dutch presenter, producer and actor

Sport 
 Ron Zwerver (born 1967) a retired volleyball player, competed in three consecutive Summer Olympics
 Michael Duursma (born 1978), baseball player
 Laura de Witte (born 1995), sprinter
 Joris Kramer (born 1996) a Dutch footballer with over 100 club caps
 Thomas Ouwejan (born 1996) Dutch footballer currently playing for AZ Alkmaar

Gallery

References

External links

Official website

 
Municipalities of North Holland
Populated places in North Holland